Alicia Graciana Eguren (Buenos Aires, 1924 - Buenos Aires, 26 January 1977) was an Argentine teacher, poet, essayist and journalist.

Biography
Eguren graduated from the University of Buenos Aires as a teacher of literature. She worked as a teacher of literature both in Buenos Aires and Rosario, Santa Fe. She worked at the newspaper Con Todo and the magazine Nuevo Hombre. She also edited the cultural magazine Sexto Continente. In 1946, she met and later married the Peronist leader, John William Cooke in a study center. Between 1946 and 1951, she published five books of poetry, which had a tendency to Catholic idealism. In 1953, she joined the Ministry of Foreign Affairs and married the diplomat Pedro Catella, whom she accompanied to London.

Selected works
 Dios y el mundo,
 El canto de la tierra inicial,
 Poemas del siglo XX,
 Aquí, entre magias y espigas,
 El talud descuajado''.

References

1924 births
1977 deaths
Argentine educators
Argentine women educators
20th-century Argentine poets
Argentine women poets
Argentine essayists
Argentine women essayists
Argentine journalists
Argentine women journalists
Writers from Buenos Aires
University of Buenos Aires alumni
20th-century women writers
20th-century essayists
20th-century journalists